AKKRA may refer to:

Accra, the capital city of Ghana
Acra (fortress) in Jerusalem during the Hellenistic period
Aqrah, city of Iraq
Akkra, a type of fritter